Elections to Gateshead Council in Tyne and Wear, England were held on 4 May 2000. One third of the council was up for election and the Labour Party kept overall control of the council.

As part of an experiment to try to raise turnout, Bensham and Whickham North wards saw postal voting allowed for all voters. Turnout in Bensham ward rose from 20% in 1999 to 46% in this election, while Whickham North saw a turnout of 61%.

After the election, the composition of the council was:
Labour 47
Liberal Democrat 18
Liberal 1

Election result

References

External links
Official report on the electoral pilot at Gateshead elections published

2000 English local elections
2000
20th century in Tyne and Wear